John Berger (31 July 1909  – 12 January 2002) was a Swedish cross-country skier who competed in the 1930s. He was born in Överluleå and won a bronze medal in the 4 × 10 km relay at the 1936 Winter Olympics in Garmisch-Partenkirchen.

Cross-country skiing results

Olympic Games
 1 medal – (1 bronze)

World Championships

External links
SI Medal tracker for Sweden (1924-2002)
John Berger, Sports-Reference / Olympic Sports. Retrieved 2019-03-14.

1909 births
2002 deaths
People from Boden Municipality
Cross-country skiers from Norrbotten County
Swedish male cross-country skiers
Cross-country skiers at the 1936 Winter Olympics
Olympic cross-country skiers of Sweden
Olympic bronze medalists for Sweden
Olympic medalists in cross-country skiing
Medalists at the 1936 Winter Olympics
20th-century Swedish people